John Richard Filan (born 8 February 1970) is an Australian football coach and former professional player.

As a player, he was a goalkeeper from 1989 until 2008 and notably played in the Premier League for Coventry City where he was a specialist at kicking the ball out of the stadium when under pressure, Blackburn Rovers and Wigan Athletic, having also been contracted without playing for Nottingham Forest in England's top division. He also played in the Football League for Cambridge United and Doncaster Rovers, and in his native country for St. George Saints, Wollongong Wolves and Sydney F.C. He was capped three times by Australia.

Following retirement, Filan has worked as a coach and held a role with Sydney FC before a spell as assistant manager with both Macclesfield Town and Shrewsbury Town.

Club career
He played for St. George Saints and Wollongong Wolves in the old National Soccer League in Australia before moving to England to join Cambridge United in 1993, after an unsuccessful trial at Southampton. In 1995, he signed for Coventry City, then moved on to Blackburn Rovers in 1997.

He joined Wigan Athletic in December 2001 for £600,000. Prior to the start of Wigan's debut season in the Premier League he had missed only one match for the club but was injured at the start of the 2005–06 season with Wigan's new signing Mike Pollitt taking his place in the side. Filan, however signed a new contract which kept him at the club until 2007. Seeing out his contract with Wigan, he was released at the end of the season. Whilst at Wigan he appeared as a substitute in the 2006 Football League Cup Final when Pollitt had to come off early in the first half with an injury. He is also remembered for saving a Nolberto Solano penalty in a 1–0 win over Newcastle United in February 2007.

International career
Filan was a member of the Australian team that competed at the 1992 Summer Olympics in Barcelona and finished in fourth place. As he has an Irish passport through his ancestry, he once sought to play international football for Ireland. However, FIFA ruled against it in February 1999 because he had played for the Australian Olympic team.

Coaching career
Filan returned to Australia in semi-retirement, resettling in his home town of Sydney. In August 2007 agreed terms with A-League side Sydney FC as backup to Clint Bolton, however the deal fell through citing outside issues.

Filan was appointed as assistant manager to John Askey at League One side Shrewsbury Town in June 2018, having previously worked with Askey during his managerial tenure at Macclesfield Town. This role lasted only five months, with the whole management team departing after only four wins in seventeen league matches.

Honours
Blackburn Rovers
 Football League First Division runner-up: 2000–01

Wigan Athletic
 Football League Championship runner-up: 2004–05
 Football League Second Division: 2002–03

Individual
PFA Team of the Year: 2002–03 Second Division

References

External links
Sydney FC profile

1970 births
Living people
Soccer players from Sydney
Australian people of Irish descent
Association football goalkeepers
Australian expatriate soccer players
Australia international soccer players
Olympic soccer players of Australia
Footballers at the 1992 Summer Olympics
Australian expatriate sportspeople in England
Expatriate footballers in England
Premier League players
English Football League players
National Soccer League (Australia) players
Blackburn Rovers F.C. players
Cambridge United F.C. players
Coventry City F.C. players
Doncaster Rovers F.C. players
Nottingham Forest F.C. players
Sydney FC players
Wigan Athletic F.C. players
Wollongong Wolves FC players
St. George Saints players
Blackburn Rovers F.C. non-playing staff
Macclesfield Town F.C. non-playing staff
Shrewsbury Town F.C. non-playing staff
Australian soccer players